The Men's elimination competition at the 2021 UCI Track Cycling World Championships was held on 24 October 2021.

Results
The race was started at 16:39.

References

Men's elimination